The Melach is a river of Tyrol, Austria, in the western part of the Innsbruck-Land District, a tributary of the Inn.

It is formed by the confluence of several smaller streams at the foot of the Lisenser Fernerkogel. It passes through the villages Gries and Sellrain and discharges between Unterperfuss and Kematen from the right into the Inn.

References

Rivers of Tyrol (state)
Rivers of Austria